Michelfeld Abbey was a Benedictine monastery in Auerbach in der Oberpfalz in Bavaria, Germany.

History
The monastery, dedicated to Saint Michael and Saint John the Evangelist, was founded in 1119 by Bishop Otto I of Bamberg. It was dissolved in the Reformation, in 1556. Re-opened temporarily in 1661 and permanently in 1684, it was put under the administration of the Electors of Bavaria on 13 March 1802 and finally dissolved in 1803 in the secularisation of Bavaria.

Buildings
The abbey church, refurbished throughout in the Baroque style in the early 18th century by the Asam brothers, became the parish church. Other former monastic buildings now accommodate a care home of the  run by the Franciscan Sisters of Dillingen.

External links
 Klöster in Bayern: St. Michelfeld in der Oberpfalz 
 Regens-Wagner-Stiftung website 

Benedictine monasteries in Germany
Monasteries in Bavaria
1110s establishments in the Holy Roman Empire
1119 establishments in Europe
Religious organizations established in the 1110s
Christian monasteries established in the 12th century